Metarranthis amyrisaria is a species of geometrid moth in the family Geometridae. It is found in North America.

The MONA or Hodges number for Metarranthis amyrisaria is 6824.

References

Further reading

 

Ennominae
Articles created by Qbugbot
Moths described in 1860